The Heliodisplay is an air-based display using principally air that is already present in the operating environment (room or space). The system developed by IO2 Technology in 2001 uses a projection unit focused onto multiple layers of air and dry micron-size atomized particles in mid-air, resulting in a two-dimensional display that appears to float (3d when using 3d content). This is similar in principle to the cinematic technique of rear projection and can appear three-dimensional when using appropriate content. As dark areas of the image may appear invisible, the image may be more realistic than on a projection screen, although it is still not volumetric. However the system does allow for multiple viewing and dual viewing (back and front) when combined with two light sources. The necessity of an oblique viewing angle +/- 30 degrees may be required for various configurations due to the rear-projection requirement.

Heliodisplay can operate as a free-space touchscreen when the equipment is ordered as an interactive unit with embedded sensors in the equipment. The original prototype of 2001 used a PC that sees the Heliodisplay as a pointing device, like a mouse. With the supplied software installed, one can use a finger, pen, or another object as cursor control and navigate or interact with simple content. As of 2010, no computer or drivers are required. The interactive version ("i") of the heliodisplay contains an embedded processor that controls these functions internally for single touch, or multiple touch interactivity using an equipment mounted arrangement but without the IR laser field found on the earlier versions. The larger equipment such as the systems that project life-size people capable of image diagonals up to 2.3 m also have the same footprint, about the same size as a sheet of paper. 

The air-based system is formed by a series of metal plates, and the original Heliodisplay could run for several hours although current models can operate continuously. 2008 model Heliodisplays use 80 ml to 120 ml of water per hour (most used for cooling), depending on screen size and user settings, although the medium is primarily air. Various versions of the heliodisplay work predominantly from the surrounding air (such as under museum environments) where there are negligible affect to the surrounding space. A tissue paper can be left on the exhaust side of the unit for a 24-hour period without any effect of moisture to it as compared to other mist or fog generating equipment that relies more on pumping a liquid or vaporizer and thereby affecting the surrounding air.

The Heliodisplay was invented by Mr. Dyner, who built it as a five-inch interactive prototype in 2000-2001 before patenting the free-space display technology. The original system used a CMOS camera and IR laser to track the position of a finger in mid-air and update the projected image to enable the first of its kind co-located display with mid-air controller interface. IO2 Technology commercialized the original versions along with improvements over the years in developing the product line. The Heliodisplay is sold directly worldwide by IO2 Technology with offices in The Bay Area of Northern California.

Models

M1
The original M1 units produced by IO2 were advanced prototypes and proof-of-concept. These are the first Heliodisplay developed by the IO2 Technology. They have all the above said properties. But they have less fidelity than the future systems although adopted various ion-discharge plates  and showcased in 2003. This first generation Heliodisplay supported only a 22” image and utilized an IR light source and an IR camera to track the position of a finger for cursor controlling the images.

M2
The second-generation M2 Heliodisplay supports a 30" image with 16.7 million colours and a 2000:1 contrast ratio. The interactive M2i version includes virtual touchscreen capability.

M3 and M30
The new third-generation M3 version launched on February 28, 2007  has the same basic specifications as the M2 but is said to be much quieter, with improved brightness and clarity and more stable operation with an improved tri-flow system.

Apart from displaying at a standard ratio of 4:3 it also displays 16:9 widescreen ratio. There is also an interactive version called the M3i.

The M30 is the updated version of the M3, which fits into the current model numbering system, 30 designating the diagonal screen size.

M50 and M100

In late 2007, IO2 Technology introduced two larger Heliodisplays, the M50 and M100. The M50 has a 50" diagonal image, equivalent to displaying a life-size head-and-shoulders person. The M100 has a 100" diagonal image, equivalent to displaying a large full-body person (about 2 meters tall).

S and L and XL

In 2011 IO2 reintroduced the smaller format Heliodisplays along with the standard L(large) models that project approximately 2 meter tall image (for lifesize person projections). The L models can be placed on the floor as a standing tower and take up slightly more area that a sheet of paper (14 inches in diameter) and weigh in around 70 lbs (35 kg) allowing it to be moved around by one person. Power consumption for the base tower 2 meter version is as energy efficient as the legacy models and consumes around 300 watts. The system is based on improvements to the M100, and similarly, the s (small) models over the legacy versions of the m30 both in image and user interface. The XL model is a separate system that supports larger format images beyond the 2 meter range. All units from 2009 have a simple interface with a single on/off button and power cord.

i versions
IO2 incorporated various advances to the existing platforms and most equipment weight was reduced by close to 50%. Current 2.3 meter system now weigh closer to 38 lb (17.2 kg), along with a 20% reduction in form factor and footprint.  Equipment efficiency was improved to over 90%, while still maintaining its relatively quiet operation of around 39 dB (as compared to other fan based technologies). Image recovery time is under 1.0 seconds in some models, along with wireless communication to limit the cables to only the power cord.  Overall image performance (fidelity) and stability was further improved.

References

External links 
 The IO2 website
 "Interactive 3D Display: It's here!" article from OhGizmo.com
 Sci-fi projections Article from CBC, March 22, 2007

Media

Early footage (~2002) 
 Display of a wristwatch 
 A famous clip showing the Heliodisplay's interactive navigation using a map display 
 Display of a car's exterior

More recent footage 
 IO2 Technology video page
 IO2 Technology's YouTube page

Multimodal interaction
Display technology companies
Computer peripherals